Jesus College is one of the constituent colleges of the University of Oxford in England.  The college was founded in 1571 by Queen Elizabeth I at the request of Hugh Price, a Welsh clergyman, who was Treasurer of St David's Cathedral in Pembrokeshire. The college still has strong links with Wales, and about 15% of students are Welsh. There are 340 undergraduates and 190 students carrying out postgraduate studies. Women have been admitted since 1974, when the college was one of the first five men's colleges to become co-educational. Old members of Jesus College are sometimes known as "Jesubites".

Mathematicians who have studied at Jesus College include Nigel Hitchin (Savilian Professor of Geometry at Oxford 1997–2016), Jonathan Borwein (a former Rhodes Scholar who has held professorial appointments in Canada and Australia), and Jim Mauldon (who taught at Oxford before moving to the United States to teach at Amherst College in Massachusetts). David E. Evans is Professor of Mathematics at Cardiff University, and H. W. Lloyd Tanner was Professor of Mathematics and Astronomy at one of its predecessor institutions, the University College of South Wales and Monmouthshire.  Several noted individuals from biology, botany and zoology were educated at the college, including the Welsh clergyman Hugh Davies (whose Welsh Botanology of 1813 was the first publication to cross-reference the Welsh-language and the scientific names of plants), Edward Bagnall Poulton (Professor of Zoology at Oxford) and James Brontë Gatenby (Professor of Zoology at Trinity College, Dublin).  Frank Greenaway was Keeper of the Department of Chemistry at the Science Museum in London for over 20 years, and the physicist Chris Rapley was director of the museum 2007–2010.  Other physicists who are Old Members of the college include Michael Woolfson (a former Professor of Physics at the University of York) and Edward Hinds (whose work on ultra-cold matter won him the Rumford Medal of the Royal Society in 2008).  Edwin Stevens, who studied Natural Science at the college, designed the world's first wearable hearing aid, and Sir Graham Sutton became director-general of the Meteorological Office ('Met Office').

The college had its own science laboratories from 1907 to 1947, which were overseen (for all but the last three years) by the physical chemist David Chapman, a Fellow of the college from 1907 to 1944.  At the time of their closure, they were the last college-based science laboratories at the university. They were named the Sir Leoline Jenkins laboratories, after a former principal of the college.  Scientific research and tuition (particularly in chemistry) became an important part of the college's academic life after the construction of the laboratories. The brochure produced for the opening ceremony noted that the number of science students at the college had increased rapidly in recent years, and that provision of college laboratories would assist the tuition of undergraduates, as well as attracting to Jesus College those graduates of the University of Wales who wished to continue their research at Oxford.  One of the college science lecturers had a link with Imperial Chemical Industries (ICI); 17 students joined ICI between the two World Wars, some of whom (such as John Rose) reached senior levels in the company.  The laboratories became unnecessary when the university began to provide centralised facilities for students, and they were closed in 1947.

Alumni 
Abbreviations used in the following tables
 M – Year of matriculation at Jesus College (a dash indicates that the individual did not matriculate at the college)
 G – Year of graduation / conclusion of study at Jesus College (a dash indicates that the individual moved to another college before graduating or concluding studies)
 DNG – Did not graduate: left the college without obtaining a degree
 ? – Year unknown; approximate year used for table-sorting purposes
 (F)  – later became a Fellow of Jesus College, and included on the list of Principals and Fellows
 (HF)  – later became an Honorary Fellow of Jesus College, and included on the list of Honorary Fellows

Degree abbreviations
 Undergraduate degree: BA – Bachelor of Arts
 Postgraduate degrees:
BSc – Bachelor of Science
DPhil – Doctor of Philosophy
MA – Master of Arts
MB – Bachelor of Medicine
MD – Doctor of Medicine
MPhil – Master of Philosophy
MSc – Master of Science

The subject studied and the degree classification are included, where known.  Until the early 19th century, undergraduates read for a Bachelor of Arts degree that included study of Latin and Greek texts, mathematics, geometry, philosophy and theology.  Individual subjects at undergraduate level were only introduced later: for example, Mathematics (1805), Natural Science (1850), Jurisprudence (1851, although it had been available before this to students who obtained special permission), Modern History (1851) and Theology (1871). Geography and Modern Languages were introduced in the 20th century. Music had been taught as a specialist subject, rather than being part of the BA course, before these changes; medicine was studied as a post-graduate subject.

Mathematicians

Physicians

Biologists and other natural scientists

Chemists

Physicists

Other scientists

References 
Notes

Bibliography

 The Jesus College Record – annual publication. Cited in references as: JCR
 Jesus College Newsletter – bi-annual publication (Trinity Term and Michaelmas Term). Cited in references as: JCN
  Cited in references as: Baker
  Cited in references as: Foster, 1500–1714
  Cited in references as: Foster, 1715–1886
  Cited in references as: Oxford Men
  Cited in references as: Members List
  Cited in references as: Honours Supplement 1930
  Cited in references as: Honours Supplement 1950
  Cited in references as: Honours Supplement 1965
   Cited in references as: ODNB
  Cited in references as: Honours
  Cited in references as: DWB
   Cited in references as: Who's Who
   Cited in references as: Who Was Who

Alumni Mathematics
Lists of people associated with the University of Oxford